Corbihelia is a proposed phylum of eukaryotes.

Classification
Based on studies done by Cavalier-Smith, Chao & Lewis 2015
 Super Class Endohelia Cavalier-Smith 2015
 Class Endohelea Cavalier-Smith 2012
 Order Microhelida Cavalier-Smith 2011
 Family Microheliellidae Cavalier-Smith 2011
 Genus Microheliella Cavalier-Smith & Chao 2012
 Order Heliomonadida Cavalier-Smith 1993 emend. Cavalier-Smith 2012
 Family Heliomorphidae Cavalier-Smith & Bass 2009
 Genus Heliomorpha Cavalier-Smith & Bass 2009
 Super Class Corbistoma Cavalier-Smith 2015
 Class Picomonadea Seenivasan et al. 2013 [Biliphyta; Picobiliphytes; Picozoa Seenivasan et al. 2013]
 Order Picomonadida Seenivasan et al. 2013
 Family Picomonadidae Seenivasan et al. 2013
 Genus Picomonas Seenivasan et al. 2013
 Class Telonemea Cavalier-Smith 1993 (Telonemia Shalchian-Tabrizi 2006]
 Order Telonemida Cavalier-Smith 1993
 Family Telonemidae Cavalier-Smith 1993
 Genus Lateronema Cavalier-Smith 2015
 Genus Telonema Greissmann 1913

References

External links 

Cryptista
Taxa named by Thomas Cavalier-Smith
Bikont phyla